Tabellaria is a genus of freshwater diatoms (Bacillariophyta). They are cuboid in shape, and the frustules (siliceous cell walls) are attached at the corners so that the colonies assume a zigzag shape.

Further reading

References

External links
 Protist Images Database:Tabellaria - Micrographs of Tabellaria species, but with only T. fenestrata identified to the species level
 - Tabellaria at algaebase.org

Diatom genera
Fragilariophyceae
Cuboids